La Capital is a newspaper published in Santa Fe, Argentina.

La Capital may also refer to:

Newspapers
 La Capital (Mar del Plata)

Places
 La Capital Department, Santa Fe
 La Capital Department, San Luis

See also
 Le Capital, a 2012 French film directed by Costa-Gavras
 La Capitale, a French-language Belgian daily newspaper
 La Capitale (company), a financial company based in Quebec